Riders from Nowhere is a 1940 American Western film directed by Raymond K. Johnson and written by Carl Krusada. The film stars Jack Randall, Margaret Roach, Ernie Adams, Tom London, Charles King and Nelson McDowell. The film was released on December 30, 1940, by Monogram Pictures.

Plot
Assuming the identity of a Ranger he finds dying on the trail, Jack Rankin, aided by his sidekick Manny, begins to clean up the lawless town of Brimstone, which is being preyed upon by outlaws robbing the nearby gold mines of the bullion shipments, secretly led by Frank Mason and his chief henchman Trigger. He is uncovered by the arrival of the dead man's sister, Marian Adams and is accused of killing the Ranger.

Cast          
Jack Randall as Jack Rankin
Margaret Roach as Marian Adams
Ernie Adams as Manny
Tom London as Mason
Charles King as Trigger
Nelson McDowell as Undertaker
George Chesebro as Bart
Dorothy Vernon as Mrs. Gregory

References

External links
 

1940 films
American Western (genre) films
1940 Western (genre) films
Monogram Pictures films
Films directed by Raymond K. Johnson
American black-and-white films
1940s English-language films
1940s American films